A by-election was be held for the New South Wales Legislative Assembly electorate of Carcoar on 14 June 1876 because of the resignation of Solomon Meyer. His company TF Meyer and Co had become insolvent.

Dates

Result

Solomon Meyer resigned.

See also
Electoral results for the district of Carcoar
List of New South Wales state by-elections

References

1876 elections in Australia
New South Wales state by-elections
1870s in New South Wales